The basketball tournament at the 1955 Pan American Games was held from March 13 to March 24, 1955 in Mexico City, Mexico.

Men's competition

Participating nations

Results

 United States 78-49 Brazil
 United States 85-55 Mexico
 United States 84-56 Cuba
 United States 72-29 Venezuela
 Argentina 72-39 Venezuela
 Argentina 78-64 Mexico
 Argentina 54-53 United States
 Argentina 66-50 Cuba 
 Brasil 86-44 Venezuela 
 Brasil 95-69 Cuba  
 Brasil 61-57 Argentina 
 Brasil 65-59 Mexico 
 Mexico 89-74 Cuba 
 Mexico 93-49 Venezuela 
 Cuba 86-69 Venezuela

Final ranking

Medalists

Awards

Women's competition

Participating nations
The women's basketball team to represent the U.S. at the Second Pan American Games in March 1955 in Mexico City included Lometa Odom. The U.S. team went 8-0 and captured the gold medal.

Final ranking

1. USA
2. Argentina 
3. Brazil

Awards

References

 
 basketpedya 
 
  .

1955
Events at the 1955 Pan American Games
Pan American Games
Pan American Games
1955 Pan American Games